The CONCACAF Champions League U13 is an annual youth continental club football invitational competition organized by CONCACAF. The goal of the competition is to develop the sport and talent of football within the CONCACAF region, which includes North and Central America, and the Caribbean. CONCACAF invites national football associations to select their best club teams to represent the country at a continental level.  The under-13 tournament is the youngest age group ever to compete in an official CONCACAF event. It is officially known as Scotiabank CONCACAF U13 Champions Leagues for sponsorship reasons.

History 

The competition was initially created in 2015 and brought together 8 U-13 football clubs from 7 different countries across the CONCACAF region for a chance to compete in a professional-level, international CONCACAF sanctioned development tournament. The first competition took place from August 4, 2015, to August 8, 2015, and was held in the Cruz Azul Acoxpa Academy Training Facility. (18 teams, 128 players and 16 matches)
The competition was a great experience for everyone involved and as a result, is still being executed on a yearly basis.  The 2016 competition kicked off on July 23 with 16 club teams from 10 countries throughout North America, Central America and the Caribbean. The tournament took place from July 23–30, 2016 at the Universidad Intercontinental in Mexico City. The 2017 edition of the initiative starts the 5th of August in Toluca, Mexico at La Nueva Casa de Fútbol de la FMF and ends the 12th. (16 teams, 288 players, 40 matches) The 2018 edition of the Scotiabank Concacaf Under-13 Champion League will take place August 12-23, 2018, in Toluca City, Mexico (at the Federación Mexicana de Fútbol’s (FEMEXFUT) Casa de Fútbol).

Tournament Format 

Sixteen club teams from the Caribbean, Central America and North America are divided into four groups of four teams. The tournament follows a round-robin group format which guarantees each team three group games. The top two teams in each  of the four-team groups advance to the quarterfinals which are then followed by the semifinals, third-place match and final match. All games are 60 minutes in duration.  The 2017 edition of the Scotiabank CONCACAF Champions League Under-13 Tournament includes a new Shield Tournament for teams who did not advance during the group stage. The Shield Tournament is completed in a round-robin format and the winning team is awarded a trophy. (2017 Shield tournament winner: Chicago Fire)

Finals

Awards 

The awards ceremony is staged on the field at the end of the final match. This opportunity gives teams and fans the feel of a professional tournament. There are several awards and prizes awarded to not on the winning team but as well as individual performance. There are 4 main types of individual awards which include the Golden Boot, the Golden Ball, the Golden Glove, and the most valuable player. The Golden Boot award goes to the top goal scorer of the tournament. The Golden Ball is presented to the outstanding player of the tournament. The Golden Glove is awarded to the most outstanding goalkeeper and the Most Valuable Player award is given to the player who demonstrates top performance among all players in the tournament.(2017: Most Valuable Player (Luis Fernado Renteria Farias/Cantera Norte), Golden Boot (Miguel Angel/Cantera Norte), Golden Glove (Dino Bontis/Toronto FC), Fiar play award (CD Victoria).

2016 Champions - CD Santa Ana (SLV)

2015 Teams

Group A 

 Club Toluca (MEX) 
 Club Deportivo Chalatenango (SLV)
 Club Sport Herediano (CRC)
 Chepo Fútbol Club (PAN)

Group B 

 Montreal Impact (CAN) 
 Aguilas de UAS (MEX) 
 Harbour View FC (JAM) 
 DC United (USA)

Group stage

Group A

Group B

2016 Teams

Group A 
 Buhos de Hermosillo FC (MEX) 
 San Juan Jabloteh FC (TRI)
 Harbour View FC (JAM)
 Real Esteli FC (NCA)

Group B 
 Comunicaciones FC (GUA) 
 L.D. Alajuelense (CRC)
 Vancouver Whitecaps FC (CAN)
 Menor Tijuana (MEX)

Group C 
 Pungarabato Guerrero (MEX) 
 Sporting Kansas City (USA)
 Chorrillo FC (PAN)
 C.D. Santa Ana (SLV)

Group D 
 Instituto Cedrus (MEX) 
 ADFA Ahuachapan (SLV)
 C.S. Herediano (CRC)
 Montreal Impact (CAN)

Group stage

Group A 

Source: CONCACAF

Group B 

Source: CONCACAF

Group C 

Source: CONCACAF

Group D 

Source: CONCACAF

2017 Teams

Group A 
 LM Boca del Rio (MEX)
 Honduras Club (HON)
 Portmore Utd. (JAM) 
 Plaza Amador (PAN)

Group B 
 Universidad Cantera Norte (MEX) 
 C.D. Santa Ana (SLV) 
 Toronto FC (CAN) 
 Real Esteli (NIC)

Group C 
 Pioneros Cancún (MEX) 
 T&T Club (T&T) 
 L.D. Alajuelense (CR) 
 San Salvador FC (SLV)

Group D 
 Fuerza Naranja (MEX) 
 C.S. Herediano (CR) 
 Chicago Fire (USA) 
 Vancouver Whitecaps (CAN)

Group stage

Group A 

Source: CONCACAF

Group B 

Source: CONCACAF

Group C 

Source: CONCACAF

Group D

2018 Teams

Group A 
 Juniors Tampico (MEX)
 Montreal Impact (CAN)
 A.D. Liga Deportiva Alajuelense (CRC) 
 CD Santa Ana (SLV)

Group B 
 CECAF San Luis (MEX) 
 Futbol Consultans (CRC) 
 San Miguel (SLV) 
 Real Esteli F.C. (NIC)

Group C 
 Cantera Yucatan (MEX) 
 LAFC (USA) 
 Cd Plaza Amador (PAN) 
 Mount Pleasant Academy (JAM)

Group D 
 Aguilas del UAGRO (MEX) 
 Club Olimpia (HON) 
 San Juan Jabloteh (TRI) 
 Toronto Fc (CAN)

Group stage

Group A

Group B

Group C

Group D

Knockout stage

2019 Teams

Group A 
 Montreal Impact (CAN)
 San Juan Jabloteh (TRI)
 Santa Ana (SAL)
 Guerreros de Coahuila (MEX)

Group B 
 Costa Rica 2
 Philadelphia Union (USA)
 Chapulineros de Oaxaca (MEX)
 Luz y Vida de Choluteca (HON)

Group C 
 Liga Deportiva Alajuelense (CRC)
 Club Comunicaciones (GUA)
 Rayados Victoria (MEX)
 Managua FC (NIC)

Group D 
 Vancouver Whitecaps (CAN)
 Mount Pleasant (JAM)
 CD Universitario (PAN)
 Pioneros de Cancun (MEX)

Group stage

Group A

Group B

Group C

Group D

Shield Knockout Stage

Winners Knockout Stage

References

External links 
Official Website
http://www.scotiabank.com.mx/es-mx/u-13/default.aspx
http://www.femexfut.org.mx/#/
http://amateur.femexfut.org.mx/#/
http://www.uic.edu.mx/

 
Under-13
Youth football leagues in North America
Multi-national association football leagues in North America
North American youth sports competitions